Eugene Kormendi (1889–1959) was a Hungarian sculptor. He studied at the Academy of Budapest before moving to Paris to collaborate with Auguste Rodin and Jean Paul Lorenz. Kormendi first came to the United States in 1939 along with his wife, Elizabeth, to attend the New York World's fair. The outbreak of World War I prevented him from returning to Europe, hence he stayed in the United States to pursue his career. Starting in 1947, he was sculptor in residence at the University of Notre Dame until the end of his career.

List of Works
 Turkish Hungarian monument, Jászberény, 1909,
 0 kilométerkő Madonna, Budapest, 1932 (destroyed during World War II)
 Monument to Heroes who died in World War I, Geszt, 1937,
 World War I memorial, Balassagyarmat, 1937
 University of Notre Dame
 “St. Thomas More”, “Christ the King” - Notre Dame Law School 
 "The Graduate” - Alumni Hall
 “Commodore Barry” - Dillon Hall 
 “St. Joseph with Lilly” - Lyons Hall 
 “St. Andrew” - Morrissey Hall 
 “St. Christopher” - Rockne Memorial 
 “The Good Shepherd”; “St. Raphael the Archangel” - St. Liam Hall Infirmary 
 "Mother and Child", "Head of a young man", "Figure Group", "St. Francis of Assisi", Smithsonian American Art Museum
World War I memorial, Seven Dolors Shrine, Valparaiso, Indiana
Christ Light of the World, USCCB building, Washington DC,

See also
TKPAGE

References

External links
Eugene Kormendi

Hungarian sculptors
Hungarian art
1889 births 
1959 deaths

20th-century sculptors